Ifedore is a Local Government Area in Ondo State, Nigeria. Its headquarters is in the town of Igbara-Oke. Elizade University is located in the area.

It has an area of 295 km and a population of 176,327 at the 2006 census.
 
The postal code of the area is 340.

References

Local Government Areas in Ondo State
Local Government Areas in Yorubaland